Alphonse may refer to:
 Alphonse (given name)
 Alphonse (surname)
 Alphonse Atoll, one of two atolls in the Seychelles' Alphonse Group

See also
Alphons
Alfonso (disambiguation)